Catholic Church of Mount Lu is a Catholic Church on Mount Lu in Jiujiang, Jiangxi, China.

History
The Catholic Church of Mount Lu was originally built in 1908, three years before the fall of the Qing dynasty (1644–1911). It is said that the church was designed and built by French missionary Louis-Elisée Fatiguet.

It was inscribed as a municipal-level protection unit by the Jiujiang Municipal Government in 1986.

Architecture
The church faces the south and its shape is like a rectangle. There is a cross on the roof.

Gallery

References

Buildings and structures in Jiujiang
Tourist attractions in Jiujiang
1908 establishments in China
Roman Catholic churches in Jiangxi
Churches completed in 1908